is a public junior college in Ōita, Ōita Prefecture, Japan, established in 1961. The university has departments in art, music, global studies, and information and communication.

References

External links
 Official website 

Educational institutions established in 1961
Public universities in Japan
Universities and colleges in Ōita Prefecture
Japanese junior colleges
1961 establishments in Japan